The 2010 ISF Women's World Championship was an international softball competition being held at Estadio La Rinconada and Estadio Fuerte Tiuna in Caracas, Venezuela from June 23 to July 2, 2010. It was the 12th edition of the tournament.

In the end, the United States won their ninth and seventh consecutive title.

Mascot 

The mascot chosen for this edition is called Sofi, a white cat so cute, beautiful, insightful and courageous, as is the Venezuelan woman. To promote this event as part of the celebration of Venezuelan Bicentennial of Independence. Designed by Fractal Studio, a design studio in Venezuela. The name Sofi is a contraction of Softball International.

First round

Pool A

Pool B

Playoffs

Day 1

Day 2

Medal round

Final standings

External links
 Official Website
 Schedule
 ISF Softball at Twitter

References

Isf Women's World Championship, 2010
2010 ISF Women's World Championship
Women's Softball World Championship
Sports competitions in Caracas
Softball competitions in Venezuela
Softball World Championship
21st century in Caracas
June 2010 sports events in South America
July 2010 sports events in South America